The Book of the Apple (Arabic: Risālat al-Tuffāha) was a medieval neoplatonic Arabic work of unknown authorship. It was spuriously ascribed to Aristotle; its date of composition is unknown although it predates the 10th century CE. Its name comes from the fact that the central dialogue is that of Aristotle, who lectures about immortality as he is dying, periodically revived and energized by smelling an apple. Despite its spuriousness, it was seriously discussed in the Encyclopedia of the Brethren of Purity. It was alto translated from Arabic into Hebrew.

References

 page 31 of Muslim Neoplatonists: An Introduction to the Thought of the Brethren of Purity, Ian Richard Netton, 1991. Edinburgh University Press, 

Pseudoaristotelian works
Islamic philosophical texts
Philosophical literature of the medieval Islamic world